Caylloma Province is the largest of eight provinces in the Arequipa Region of Peru.

Geography 
The Chila mountain range traverses the province. One of the highest mountains of the province is Mismi. Other mountains are listed below:

Political division
The province is divided into twenty districts which are:

Points of interest
The Colca Canyon lies in the Huambo and Callalli districts.

See also 
 Ccotalaca
 Ccotaña
 Muyurqa Lake
 Paraxra
 Pukara, Coporaque
 Samaquta
 Uskallaqta
 Uyu Uyu

References

Provinces of the Arequipa Region